WIOS (1480 AM) is a radio station broadcasting a format of talk. Licensed to Tawas City, Michigan, it first began broadcasting in 1958.

WIOS has essentially been a full-service MOR station throughout its existence until it changed to "all talk" 24 hours a day on June 15, 2015.

National talk radio hosts are featured throughout the weekdays, while lighter, non-political talk fare is featured on the weekends along with old-time radio shows Saturday evenings.

External links

IOS
Adult standards radio stations in the United States
Radio stations established in 1958
1958 establishments in Michigan